Southern Pacific Railroad's MC-2 class of steam locomotives was the first class to be ordered by and built for Southern Pacific (SP) as cab forward locomotives.  They were built in 1909 following the design of SP's MC-1 class built earlier that year.  The success of this locomotive model led to the design and introduction of the AC class of 4-8-8-2 cab forward locomotives in the 1930s and 1940s.

In order to get the fuel oil from the tender to the opposite end of the locomotive where the firebox sat, SP had to pressurize the oil in the tender.  of air pressure was sufficient to get the oil to the fire.

Most of the rest of the MC-2 class were "simpled" to the same size cylinders by 1931. Except for numbers 4011 and 4013 which were both scrapped by 1936, all of the MC-2 and the two former MC-1 locomotives were rebuilt again into class AC-1 with a higher boiler pressure, but a lower overall tractive effort. The MC-2 rebuilds included installation of a new 4-BL Worthington feedwater heater as well.

SP used these locomotives until after World War II, retiring and then scrapping them in 1947 and 1948.  The last locomotive of this class was scrapped on April 12, 1949, at SP's Sacramento shops.

References 
 
 

MC-2
2-8-8-2 locomotives
Baldwin locomotives
Mallet locomotives
Steam locomotives of the United States
Railway locomotives introduced in 1909
Scrapped locomotives
Standard gauge locomotives of the United States